StudioEIS (pronounced "Studio Ice") is a sculpture and design studio in Brooklyn, New York, United States. It specializes in classical figurative sculpture and visual storytelling with production in bronze, stone, and resin for exhibitions at cultural institutions, museums, and corporations worldwide.

History 
StudioEIS was founded in 1977 by New York City natives Ivan Schwartz (BFA Boston University College of Fine Arts) and Elliot Schwartz (BFA California Institute of the Arts, MFA Yale University). It pioneered the design and production of innovative figurative sculptures for use as visual storytelling elements within museum settings during the 1970s. When the company was founded there was growing resistance to using mass-produced mannequins for museum exhibitions.  StudioEIS found a niche for itself in the world of narrative storytelling for museums and with the American Bicentennial at hand and a renewed interest in American history. Numerous museums were established across the country to address topics such as African American history, civil rights, Native American history and science & technology. This confluence of talent and need created the initial impetus for StudioEIS' work.

Museums large and small began out-sourcing displays via exhibition designers, and called upon StudioEIS to create lifelike sculptures to tell stories about American culture and its political history in vivid ways that put a face to history. StudioEIS' early commissions, for the National Civil Rights Museum and the American Museum of Natural History, were figurative, life-sized, and designed to engage the museum visitor.

With its growing reputation, StudioEIS began to work outside the museum world where innovative object making through visual storytelling was born. The studio now began to work with architects, industrial and scenic designers, restaurant designers & hotel and casino designers. Sony, the Bellagio Hotel and Casino in Las Vegas, Nike's flagship stores in Portland and Chicago, The Discovery Channel, and Martha Stewart Living are among its many corporate clients. StudioEIS' sculptures have been on display outside the United States in Mexico, Japan, Taiwan, Italy, Hong Kong, and Abu Dhabi.

The prominence of the studio grew as it became especially well known for its bronze portrait sculptures and public works, which have included sculptures of iconic figures, such as Franklin D. Roosevelt, Elvis Presley, Albert Einstein, Frederick Douglass and 42 bronze Founding Fathers at the National Constitution Center - which may be the largest bronze sculpture project of its type in American history. To date, StudioEIS has created more significant historical sculptures than any studio in American history.

The distinguished portrait sculptures created by StudioEIS are featured in important cultural institutions such as The Smithsonian's National Museum of African American History, The National WWII Museum in New Orleans, The Museum of the American Revolution in Philadelphia and The American Museum of Natural History in New York City.  StudioEIS' expertise has been called upon for high-profile "forensic" reconstruction projects for George Washington's Mount Vernon Estate and Gardens, the exhibition "Written in Bone" at the National Museum of Natural History at the Smithsonian Institution and the exhibition JANE, Starvation, Cannibalism & Endurance at Jamestown for Jamestown and the Smithsonian's National Museum of Natural History.

Today StudioEIS' staff of sculptors, painters, costumers, researchers, and model-makers is enhanced by specialists in wax works, metal fabrication, and bronze casting. A project will often include collaboration with scholars in anthropology, costume history, and forensic science. The sculptures of George Washington at ages 19, 45 and 57 that were unveiled at Mount Vernon in 2006 involved state-of-the-art forensic research and computer reconstruction.

StudioEIS’ Archive resides at the Briscoe Center of American History at the University of Texas/Austin. The Archive was unveiled in November 2014.

Notable works

American history 

Virginia Women's Monument, Virginia State Capitol Grounds, Richmond VA - 2017 - 2020. Monument designed by StudioEIS and 1717 Design Group to honor the achievement of Virginia Woman in 10 Bronze Sculptures
The Lucy Burns Museum, Lorton, Virginia - 2019. Larger than life figures of Lucy Burns, Alice Paul and Dora Lewis. Three suffragettes who were beaten and tortured for seeking the vote. This will commemorate the 100th anniversary of the imprisonment of Suffragists at the Lorton Workhouse.
Museum of the American Revolution, Philadelphia, PA - April, 2017. 17 figurative sculptures representing the American Revolution including two portrait figures of the Peale brothers, Life size replica sculpture of King George III on his horse.
Benjamin Franklin College, Yale University, New Haven, CT - 2017. Bronze sculpture of Benjamin Franklin
National Museum of African American History and Culture, Smithsonian Institution, Washington, DC – 2016. 16 Portrait Sculptures for the new museum at the Smithsonian Institution
New York Historical Society, New York City - 2011. Exterior bronze Sculptures of President Lincoln and Frederick Douglass
American Revolution Museum at Yorktown, Yorktown, VA, 2016. 13 historical sculptures for the Jamestown Yorktown Foundation representing the American Revolution.
John Jay College of Criminal Justice, New York City, 2014. Bronze sculpture of Chief Justice John Jay for the lobby of the college.
The Maryland State House, Maryland Department of General Services in conjunction with the Maryland State Archives, Annapolis, MD, 2013. Bronze Sculpture of George Washington where he resigned his commission to Congress in the winter of 1783.
American Museum of Natural History, Theodore Roosevelt Memorial Hall, 2012. Bronze sculpture of Teddy Roosevelt
Virginia Capitol Foundation, Virginia Capitol, Richmond, VA, 2011. Larger than life bronze sculpture of Thomas Jefferson
York College, Jamaica, NY, 2009. Tuskegee Airman for York College
African American Burial Ground Interpretive Center, New York City, 2009. Sculptures depicting a moment in the history for New York's African American community.
 Gettysburg National Military Park, Gettysburg, PA - 2009. Bronze sculpture of Abraham Lincoln for the new Visitor Center
 Thomas Jefferson's Monticello, Charlottesville, VA - 2009. Bronze sculpture of Thomas Jefferson.
 Frederik Meijer Gardens and Sculpture Park, Grand Rapids, MI., 2008. Bronze sculpture of Lucius Lyon, 19th-century senator from Michigan
Morristown Green, Morristown, NJ - 2007. Bronze sculptures of George Washington, Alexander Hamilton and the Marquis de Lafayette
 George Washington's Mount Vernon Estate and Gardens, Mount Vernon, VA - 2006. Forensically recreated wax sculptures of George Washington at ages 19, 45, and 57, plus four bronze portrait sculptures of George Washington, Martha Washington and their grandchildren
 National Constitution Center, Philadelphia, PA - 2001. Forty-two bronze sculptures of the signers of the U.S. Constitution
 North Carolina Museum of History, Raleigh, NC - 2001. Historical bronze portrait sculptures
Truman University, Kirksville, MO, 2001. Bronze portrait figure of Harry S. Truman
 Great Platte River Road Memorial Archway Museum, Kearney, Nebraska, 2000.  Sixteen historical sculptures and two oxen
 Lowell Heritage State Park, Lowell, MA - 1984. Sixteen 18th-century sculptures depicting life in Lowell, where the Industrial Revolution began in America

Iron Range Interpretive Center, Hibbing, MN - 1977. Six figures from the late 18th century depicting the social life of the workers on the Iron Range

Social and cultural history 

 The Henry Ford Estate at Fair Lane, Dearborn, MI, 2017.  Bronze sculptures of Henry and Clara Ford
 The Edsel & Eleanor Ford House, Grosse Pointe Shores, MI, 2014. Bronze sculpture of Edsel & Eleanor Ford, for the grounds of the house.
Museum of the Bible, Washington, DC, 2017. Sculptures of Galileo, Isaac Newton and George Washington Carver.
Autry National Center of the American West, Los Angeles, CA, 2010. Figurative Sculptures: Women's History of the West
The National Civil Rights Museum, Memphis, TN - 1991. Twenty-seven sculptures representing the history of the Civil Rights Movement from 1955 through 1968
 Elvis Presley sculpture, Honolulu, HI - 2007. Bronze
Motown Cafe, Orlando, FL - 1998. 56 sculptures of Motown recording artists
 Oakland Museum, Oakland, CA – 1997. Historical sculptures for the "Art of the Gold Rush" and sculptures for the exhibition "California: A Place, A People, A Dream"
 Birmingham Civil Rights Institute, Birmingham, AL - 1992. Fifteen sculptures depicting moments from the Civil Rights Movement

Anthropology 

Peabody Museum of Natural History, Yale University, New Haven, CT - 2002. Six sculptures and cast dwellings on the history of Machu Picchu for the exhibition "Unveiling the Mystery of the Incas".
Mashantucket Pequot Museum and Research Center, Mashantucket, CT - 1997. One hundred eleven realistically painted Native American sculptures representing the history of the Mashantucket Pequot Tribe
Milwaukee Public Museum - Native American Project, Milwaukee, WI - 1999. Thirty-six painted sculptures of Pow-wow dancers.
 American Museum of Natural History, New York, NY, 1990. Construction of "King Mbunza," a completely articulated fiberglass sculpture for the artifact display in the "African Reflections" exhibit.
 Anchorage Historical and Fine Arts Museum, Anchorage, AK - 1985. Thirty-five sculptures representing the indigenous peoples of the region.

Presidential libraries and sites 

Ulysses S. Grant Presidential Library, Mississippi State University, MS - 2017. Four portrait sculptures of Grant as a Cadet, General, President and Elder Statesman.
James Madison's Montpelier, Montpelier Station, VA - 2009. Bronze sculptures of James Madison and Dolley Madison
National Trust for Historic Preservation, President Lincoln's Cottage at the Soldiers' Home, Washington, DC - 2009. Bronze sculpture of Abraham Lincoln and his horse
George H.W. Bush Presidential Library and Museum, College Station, TX - 2006. Bronze portrait sculpture of George H.W. Bush, SR.
 Franklin Delano Roosevelt Presidential Library and Museum, Hyde Park, NY - 2003. Bronze portrait sculptures of Franklin Roosevelt and Eleanor Roosevelt
 Richard M. Nixon Presidential Library and Birthplace, Yorba Linda, CA - 1990, 2002. Portrait sculptures of Richard Nixon and Zhou Enlai for a traveling exhibit; ten portrait sculptures of world leaders who influenced President Nixon's life
 The Truman Library, Independence, MO - 2001. Bronze portrait figure of Harry S. Truman
 Lyndon B. Johnson Presidential Library and Museum, Austin, TX - 1991–1994. World War II sculptures

Sports history 

San Francisco 49ers Hall of Fame, Santa Clara, California - 2017. Portrait Sculpture of Tom Rathman
NASCAR Hall of Fame, Charlotte, NC - 2009. Portrait sculptures of the founders of NASCAR
 Yankee Stadium Museum, New York, NY - 2009. Fiberglass sculptures of Don Larsen and Yogi Berra from the "1956 Perfect World Series Game"
National Collegiate Athletic Association Museum, Indianapolis, IN - 1999. 35 athletic figures, including six bronze sculptures of the "flying wedge," for the new headquarters of the NCAA
The Puerto Rico Museum of Sports, Guaynabo, Puerto Rico - 2002–2011. Portrait sculptures of renowned athletes such as Roberto Alomar, Diego Lizaedi, Carlos Ortiz, Roberto Clemente, Rafael Ramirez, Crissy Fuentes, Gigi Fernandez and many other athletes.
 Legacy Soccer Foundation, Orlando, FL - 2004. Bronze soccer player to commemorate the 10th anniversary of the World Cup

Military history 

Museum of the American Revolution, Philadelphia, PA, 2019. 2 realistically painted sculptures of military figures for the exhibition, Redcoat & Revolutions.
National Museum of the United States Army, Fort Belvoir, VA, 2014 - 2019. 10 sculptures representing two campaigns in the history of the United States Army.
National Infantry Museum, Fort Benning, GA – June 2009.  Fifty sculptures depicting the history of the U.S. Infantry
 National Museum of the Marine Corps, Quantico, VA - 2006. Seventy-four realistically painted sculptures of Marine Corps figures
 US Army Aviation Museum, Fort Rucker, AL - 2005. Bronze sculptures
 Wisconsin Veterans Museum, Madison, WI - 1992. Over sixty sculptures of military figures from the American Revolution to the Vietnam War

Science and technology 

 National Museum of Natural History, Smithsonian Institution, Washington, DC - 2009. "Written in Bone: Forensic Files of the 17th Century Chesapeake." Forensic recreation sculptures.
Museum of Science and Industry, Chicago, Illinois, 2009. Historical figure of train engineer
Griffith Observatory, Los Angeles, California - 2006. Bronze portrait figure of Albert Einstein
Virginia Air and Space Museum Center, Hampton Roads Historical Center, Hampton Roads, Virginia - 1991. Thirty sculptures of historical and contemporary figures
National Air and Space Museum, Smithsonian Institution, Washington, DC - 1978-1983 - Life-size portrait of Benjamin Franklin with reproduction of the clothing worn to celebrate the ascension of the Montgolfier Balloon in Paris in 1783; three sculptures for "The Golden Age of Flight," a racing tableau
Kansas Cosmosphere and Space Center, Hutchinson, Kansas, 1994. 4 Portrait heads of the astronaut Thomas P. Stafford.

Public works 

American Way – National Harbor – National Harbor, MD, 2016, 2017. 9 bronze sculptures including: Abraham Lincoln, Frederick Douglass, George Washington, Rosie the Riveter, FDR, Eisenhower, Churchill, Louis Armstrong and Henry Ford for the plaza.
City of Smithtown, Smithtown, New York, 2014, Bronze sculpture of Richard Smith, founder of Smithtown, NY
 Great American Project, Liberty, MO, ongoing beginning in 2012.  Bronze sculptures of Mark Twain and George Washington and Susan B. Anthony

Publications 
Kennewick Man: The Scientific Investigation of an Ancient American Skeleton. Written by Douglas W. Owsley 2014.
The 9,000-Year-Old Man Speaks, Kennewick Man. Written by Douglas Preston for the Smithsonian Magazine, 2014
JANE, Starvation, Cannibalism, and Endurance at Jamestown. Written by James Horn, William Kelso, Douglas Owsley, Beverly Straube, 2013
Their Skeletons Speak; Kennewick Man and the Paleoamerican World Written by Sally M. Walker, Douglas W. Owsley, 2012
The Many Faces of George Washington: Remaking a Presidential Icon. Written by Carla Killough McClafferty, 2011
Written in Bone: Buried Lives of Jamestown and Colonial Maryland. Written by Sally M. Walker, 2009
The National Constitution Center. Written by Michael Les Benedict, John Bogle, 2007
The Letters of Pierce Butler, 1790–1794. Edited by Terry W. Lipscomb, 2007
Cincinnati Sculpture Unveiled: The Story Behind the Art Written by Randy Centner & Philip Farr, 2006
Watching the World Change: The Stories Behind the Images of 9/11. Written by David Friend, 2006
US Postage Stamp "To Form A More Perfect Union" Commemorative Stamps. United States Postal Service, 2005
The American National Tree, National Constitution Center. Biographies from an exhibit, 2004
Mashantucket Pequot Museum & Research Center. Written by Theresa Hayward Bell, Jack Campisi, Steve Dunwell, 2000
The National Civil Rights Museum Celebrates Everyday People. Written by Alice Faye Duncan, 1995
World War II: Personal Accounts Pearl Harbor to V-J Day: A Traveling Exhibition Sponsored by The National Archives and Records Administration, 1992.  Written by Gary A. Yarrington

Lectures 
Gettysburg Foundation, Gettysburg, Pennsylvania, 2019. "Symbols, Myths & History" with Ivan Schwartz 
President Lincoln's Cottage, Washington, DC, 2018. "Statues of Limitations" with Ivan Schwartz
Metropolitan Club, Washington, DC, 2010. "Picturing History" with Ivan Schwartz
National Trust for Historic Preservation, President Lincoln's Cottage, Washington 2010. "Picturing History" with Ivan Schwartz
Gettysburg National Military Park, Gettysburg, PA, 2010. "Conversation with Ivan Schwartz", Director of StudioEIS
Montgomery College, Takoma Park, MD, 2009. "StudioEIS and the Art of Visual Storytelling, Two new sculpture of Abraham Lincoln"
Washington College, Chestertown, MD, 2006
Marymount College, New York, NY, 2006
Lower East Side Tenement Museum, New York, NY, 2000
U.S. Army Museums Conference, Fort Leonard Wood, MO, 1998.  Conference "Thinking Outside the Box"
 Exhibit Design, World Symposium, Chicago, IL, 1998
 The University of Minnesota School of Architecture, 1976

Architecture and design 
 UPS, TV Commercial, New York, NY, 2010 - Larger than life replica of wooden mannequin foot
Nurai Island Residence, Abu Dhabi, UAE, 2008 -  25 architectural models representing unique limited edition beach front villas developed by Zaya Real Estate Corporation

Further reading

On the National Constitution Center, Philadelphia 
NCC Commissions Sculptures of Founders to Depict Defining Moment, Signature, newsletter of the National Constitution Center, Fall 2001.
History Is Remade, One Bronzed Gentleman After Another,  New York Times, July 4, 2001. Written by Andy Newman
BACKSTAGE; Madame Tussaud These Two Are Not, New York Times, May 2, 2001. Written by Mary Raffalli.
Founding Faces,  Philadelphia Inquirer May 26, 2002. Written by Diana Marder.
 Founding Fathers, Large as Life, New York Times, November 24, 2002. Written by Rita Reif.

On the forensic reconstruction of George Washington at Mount Vernon 
Masterworks: A Presidential Cast, New York Home Magazine. Written by Ruth Katz
 Coming Soon to Mount Vernon, 3 Georges, New York Times, February 17, 2006. Written by Warren E. Leary.
 Putting a Face on the First President, Scientific American, February 2006. Written by Jeffery H. Schwartz

General 
 Abe, We Hardly Knew Ye This Way, New York Times, June 29, 2008. Written by Jake Mooney
 Hiding Behind the Light, in Plain Sight, New York Times, January 13, 2000. Written by Bonnie Schwartz
Art Flourishes on a Grimy Brooklyn Waterfront, New York Times, October 27, 1997. Written by Kennedy Fraser

External links 
 StudioEIS website

Buildings and structures in Brooklyn
Companies based in New York City
Arts organizations based in New York City
Design companies of the United States
American sculpture
Arts organizations established in 1977
1977 establishments in New York City